Regina Rakhimova (born  in Chusovoy) is a Russian freestyle skier, specializing in Moguls .

Rakhimova competed at the 2010 Winter Olympics for Russia. She placed 19th in the qualifying round of the moguls, advancing to the final, where she placed 9th.

As of April 2013, her best showing at the World Championships is 7th, in the 2011 moguls event.

Rakhimova made her World Cup debut in January 2009. As of March 2013, her best finish at a World Cup event is 4th, at Are in 2010/11. Her best World Cup overall finish in moguls is 11th, in 2010/11.

References

1989 births
Living people
Olympic freestyle skiers of Russia
Freestyle skiers at the 2010 Winter Olympics
Freestyle skiers at the 2014 Winter Olympics
Freestyle skiers at the 2018 Winter Olympics
People from Chusovoy
Russian female freestyle skiers
Sportspeople from Perm Krai